Christopher Cantwell Fitzgerald (born November 26, 1972) is an American actor and singer. He is known for his role as Boq in the musical Wicked and his role of Igor in Young Frankenstein, for which he earned Outer Critics Circle Award, Drama Desk Award, and Tony Award nominations. He also starred as Ogie Anhorn in the Broadway production of Waitress, with songs composed by Sara Bareilles.

Early life
Fitzgerald was born in Bryn Mawr, Pennsylvania, the son of Victoria D. Field, who worked for the American Kennel Club, and James W. Fitzgerald, Jr., a real estate agent at Coldwell Banker. He grew up in South Portland, Maine and attended Waynflete School in Portland in 1991. He graduated with a Bachelor of Arts in Theater from Rollins College in Winter Park, Florida. He is a member of Alpha Tau Omega fraternity. He also gained a master's degree in Fine Arts from the American Conservatory Theater in San Francisco.

He studied "techniques of clowning but also mime and storytelling, singing and comedy and everything. Juggling, balancing" at the Celebration Barn with Tony Montanaro in Maine.

Career

Theatre
Fitzgerald started his acting career in 1980, at the age of eight, when he appeared as the youngest boy in Portland Player's production of Oliver!. From that time on, he worked steadily in community theater and Maine's New Vaudeville shows. In college, he began his career as a summer apprentice at Williamstown Theater Festival. At age 26, in 1998, he starred in his first off-Broadway show, the controversial Corpus Christi by acclaimed playwright Terrence McNally. In the same year, he also appeared in The Matchmaker by Williamstown Theatre Festival, as well as an off-Broadway staging of The Cripple of Inishmaan.

During the following year, Fitzgerald appeared in the Sondheim-Weidman musical Wise Guys. He also performed in a production of Babes in Arms, produced by Encores! in the New York City Center.

In 2000, Fitzgerald co-starred in the 1954 Sondheim musical Saturday Night. His performance in this show earned him his first award nomination, for the Drama Desk Award for Outstanding Featured Actor in a Musical. Also in 2000, Fitzgerald played the lead role in the one-man show Fully Committed, appearing until 2001.

In 2002, Fitzgerald opened in the musical Amour, adapted from a 1943 French short story written by Marcel Aymé. He performed from October 20, 2002 until November 3, 2002. His performance earned him another nomination for the Drama Desk Award for Outstanding Featured Actor in a Musical. On October 30, 2003, Fitzgerald premiered in the musical Wicked in the role of Boq. He departed the role on January 2, 2005 and was replaced by Jeffry Kuhn.

Fitzgerald was seen in Gutenberg! The Musical!  directed by Alex Timbers from December 3, 2006, and ran until May 6, 2007.  He appeared as the character "Igor" in the Broadway production of the Mel Brooks musical Young Frankenstein, which opened on Broadway in November 2007.  For the role he received an Outer Critics Circle Award, Drama Desk Award, and a Tony Award nomination for Best Featured Actor in a Musical. Fitzgerald also played Igor in the musical's out-of-town tryouts in Seattle. During rehearsals for the show his wife gave birth to their first child, a boy named Charlie. Fitzgerald played his final performance as Igor in Young Frankenstein on November 23, 2008.

Fitzgerald played the title role in the world premiere of the burlesque-style musical Minsky's, in Los Angeles, which played at the Center Theatre in Ahmanson Theatre from January 21 – March 1, 2009, and also starred his former Young Frankenstein co-star Beth Leavel.

He played Og in the Broadway revival of Finian's Rainbow at the St. James Theatre.  For this performance, Fitzgerald won the Drama Desk Award for Outstanding Featured Actor in a Musical. He also once more received an Outer Critics Circle Award May 2010
and a Tony Award nomination for Best Featured Actor in a Musical.

He starred as Pseudolus in an all-male production of Stephen Sondheim's A Funny Thing Happened on the Way to the Forum in his tenth season with the Williamstown Theatre Festival. The sold-out show closed on July 11, 2010. In November 2010 to February 2011 he played Launcelot Gobbo in The Merchant of Venice on Broadway.

He starred as P.T. Barnum in Barnum, revived by Cameron Mackintosh, premiering at the Chichester Festival Theatre in Chichester, West Sussex, UK from July 15 through August 31, 2013.

He played the role of Amos Hart in the Broadway production of Chicago, beginning October 28, 2013. At the Williamstown Theatre Festival in July 2014 he played the role of Benny Fox in its production of June Moon. Christopher played the archangel Michael in the production of An Act of God starring Jim Parsons from May - August 2015 . In March 2016, he joined the cast of Broadway transfer Waitress, playing the role of Ogie.

Films
Fitzgerald's first film role was a bit part in the movie Boiler Room starring Vin Diesel and Ben Affleck. His next part was in the movie Personal Velocity: Three Portraits as Greg. Personal Velocity won two awards at the 2002 Sundance Film Festival, including Best Cinematography.

Fitzgerald starred in 2012's Girl Most Likely alongside Kristen Wiig, Annette Bening, Matt Dillon and Darren Criss.

Television
On the television show Twins on The WB, Fitzgerald played the character of Neil, beginning in 2005. The show was cancelled on May 18, 2006, following the merger of The WB and UPN that created the new network The CW.

He appeared in full costume as an adult Cabbage Patch doll in a Geico insurance commercial.

In 2017, Fitzgerald played the role of J.J. Valentine in the Netflix limited series Godless, and played children's entertainer/child trafficker Sonny Shine in the SyFy fantasy black comedy crime series Happy!.

Awards and nominations

References

External links
 
 
 BroadwayWorld.com interview with Christopher Fitzgerald, July 27, 2007

1972 births
Living people
People from Bryn Mawr, Pennsylvania
People from South Portland, Maine
American male singers
American male film actors
American male television actors
American male musical theatre actors
American male stage actors
American male voice actors
Drama Desk Award winners
Rollins College alumni
Male actors from Pennsylvania
Male actors from Maine
20th-century American male actors
21st-century American male actors
Waynflete School alumni